Richard L. Shurman (born May 23, 1950) is an American record producer, sound engineer, music journalist, music historian, and  backing vocalist.

He has produced numerous recordings by notable musicians including Johnny Winter, Lurrie Bell, Eddie C. Campbell, Albert Collins, Little Smokey Smothers, Jody Williams, Roy Buchanan, Big Bill Morganfield, Larry Garner, Robert Cray, Hip Linkchain, Magic Slim, Charlie Musselwhite, Otis Rush, Johnny Heartsman, and Fenton Robinson. Shurman has also written many liner notes, and is the publisher of Chicago Blues News. In 2005, he was the recipient of the Blues Foundation's "Keeping the Blues Alive" award.  He co-produced Showdown!, an album which won a Grammy Award for Best Traditional Blues Album in 1987.

Shurman was inducted into the Blues Hall of Fame in 2014 for his multitudinous contributions as a 'non-performer'.

Biography
Shurman was born in Los Alamos, New Mexico, United States, and later resided in Milwaukee and Madison, Wisconsin, before relocating to Seattle after his father secured employment with Boeing. There he befriended a number of blues musicians, and started writing articles for the British magazine, Blues Unlimited. Shurman first attended the University of Chicago in September 1968. Fearing that his continual attendance at local blues clubs may harm his education, he enrolled at the University of Washington, earning a master's degree in library science that enabled him to begin full-time employment in a suburban library back in Chicago. 
He continued to work full-time in a succession of library jobs. His occasional writing work led Shurman to interview musicians such as Albert Collins, Otis Rush, Jody Williams, Johnny Heartsman, and Lee "Shot" Williams. Shurman befriended many blues figures including Earl Hooker and Johnny Heartsman.

His involvement in, and passion for Chicago blues, led Shurman into record production work. His most successful period was with Alligator Records, often working alongside the label's founder Bruce Iglauer on production duties. Albert Collins was signed by Alligator Records in 1978, on the recommendation of Shurman, whom Collins had met in Seattle. His first release for the label was Ice Pickin''' (1978), which was recorded at Curtom Studios, Chicago, and produced by Iglauer, Shurman and Richard McLeese.

Shurman co-produced the album Showdown!, with Iglauer, which won a Grammy Award for Best Traditional Blues Album in 1987.

Shurman has contributed to various publications, including Living Blues, Juke Blues and Block Magazine. In 1997, Shurman jointly compiled and wrote the liner notes for Sonny Boy Williamson II's compilation album, His Best. In 2000, Shurman gave encouragement to Jody Williams to resume performing, and produced Williams' comeback album, Return of a Legend (2002), on which his bold playing belied his thirty-year break from music.

In 2010, following the death of Little Smokey Smothers, Shurman and Iglauer jointly penned an obituary which appeared in Living Blues.

In 2014, Shurman was inducted as a member of the Blues Hall of Fame.

Shurman has annotated many albums and contributed to chapters of books, feature articles and reviews, and for many years had a news column in Living Blues. He is also a member of the Chicago Blues Festival Advisory Committee. His annotation work included the ten disc box set, Ladies and Gentlemen... Mr. B.B. King (2012). In addition he earlier penned the liner notes for Howlin' Wolf's 1991 compilation, The Chess Box''.

Selected record production and other work

References

External links
Dick Shurman discography credits at Discogs.com
Interview with Shurman

1950 births
Living people
Record producers from Illinois
American photographers
American writers about music
American music historians
American male non-fiction writers
American music journalists
American audio engineers
American blues singers
Chicago blues musicians
20th-century American musicians
21st-century American musicians
University of Washington Information School alumni
People from Los Alamos, New Mexico
Engineers from Illinois
Historians from Illinois